The 2009 FIG World Cup circuit in Rhythmic Gymnastics includes six category A events and two category B events. With stopovers in Europe only, the competitions took place on March 6–8 in Budapest (HUN), April 4–5 in Saint Petersburg (RUS), April 16–19 in Portimão (POR), April 25–26 in Maribor (SLO), April 30 – May 2 in Pesaro (ITA), May 8–10 in Corbeil-Essonnes (FRA), August 15–17 in Kyiv (UKR) and August 21–23 in Minsk (BLR). Two events were open only to individual athletes (Maribor and Corbeil-Essonnes), while six were open to both individual athletes and groups. In all of the events, all-around competitions served as qualifications for the finals by apparatus. The world ranking points collected by the competitors at their best four World Cup events added up to a total, and the top scorers in each event were crowned winners of the overall series at the final event in Minsk, Belarus.

Formats

Medal winners

All-around

Individual

Group all-around

Apparatus

Rope

Hoop

Ball

Ribbon

5 hoops

2 ropes and 3 ribbons

Overall medal table

See also
 2009 FIG Artistic Gymnastics World Cup series

References

Rhythmic Gymnastics World Cup
2009 in gymnastics